James Dee Crowe (August 27, 1937December 24, 2021) was an American banjo player and bluegrass band leader. He first became known during his four-year stint with Jimmy Martin in the 1950s. Crowe led the bluegrass group New South from 1971 until his death in 2021.

Life and career
James Dee Crowe was born on August 27, 1937, in Lexington, Kentucky. He began playing the banjo early on and was offered a job with Jimmy Martin's Sunny Mountain Boys, a backup group in 1954. Before starting in Martin's band, Crowe played with Pee Wee Lambert and Curly Parker. 

Crowe recorded with Martin between 1956 and 1960. In 1961, he formed the Kentucky Mountain Boys, principally performing in the Lexington region.

In 1971, Crowe changed the band's name to The New South. As of 1975, the New South began to add jazz and rock influences to its bluegrass repertoire, as well as country and folk elements drawn from the work of Gram Parsons and Gordon Lightfoot, respectively.

Crowe stopped releasing new records between the late 1980s and 1992, when he founded a new band.

Kentucky Educational Television in 2008 aired a biography of James Dee Crowe, A Kentucky Treasure: The James Dee Crowe Story, produced by H. Russell Farmer.

Crowe received the Bluegrass Star Award, presented by the Bluegrass Heritage Foundation of Dallas, Texas, on October 15, 2011. The award is bestowed upon bluegrass artists who do an exemplary job of advancing traditional bluegrass music and bringing it to new audiences while preserving its character and heritage.

He died from pneumonia on December 24, 2021, in Nicholasville, Kentucky, at the age of 84.

Discography

1968: Bluegrass Holiday (Lemco)
1969: The Model Church (Lemco)
1971: Ramblin' Boy (Lemco) – reissued in 1978, with a different song order, as Blackjack (Rebel)
1973: Bluegrass Evolution (Starday)
1973: Bluegrass Holiday (King Bluegrass)
1975: J. D. Crowe & The New South (Rounder)
1978: You Can Share My Blanket (Rounder)
1980: My Home Ain't in the Hall of Fame (Rounder)
1981: Somewhere Between (Rounder)
1982: Live in Japan (Rounder)
1986: Straight Ahead (Rounder)
1994: Flashback (Rounder)
1999: Come on Down to My World (Rounder)
2006: Lefty's Old Guitar (Rounder)

Citations

Sources

External links

 Home page: 
 Feature story on J. D. Crowe: 
 J.D. Crowe Interview NAMM Oral History Library (2016)
 
 
 J. D. Crowe featured player in Banjo All-Stars Trading Cards, Series 1

1937 births
2021 deaths
American banjoists
American country singer-songwriters
Bluegrass Album Band members
Bluegrass musicians from Kentucky
Country musicians from Kentucky
Longview (American band) members
Musicians from Lexington, Kentucky
New South (band) members
Rounder Records artists
Singer-songwriters from Kentucky
Deaths from pneumonia in Kentucky